Stacy Piagno (born March 7, 1991) is a member of the United States women's national baseball team which won a gold medal at the 2015 Pan American Games.

Playing career
Piagno played college softball at the University of Tampa. On July 23, 2015, Piagno threw the first no-hitter in women’s baseball at the Pan American Games, in Toronto, defeating the Puerto Rico women's national baseball team. In June 2016, she was signed by the Sonoma Stompers of the Pacific Association of Professional Baseball Clubs. This made her and fellow Stompers teammate outfielder-pitcher Kelsie Whitmore the first women to play professional baseball as teammates since the 1950s.

Sonoma Stompers (2016–2017) 
On July 1, 2016, Piagno made her professional debut vs. the San Rafael Pacifics.

On July 15, 2017, Piagno recorded a win against the Pittsburg Diamonds in her first start of the 2017 season. In doing so, she became the third woman since the 1950s to win a game in an American men's professional league.
Piagno also had an 11 inning scoreless streak from July 15-August 19. She ended the season with a 1-0 record and a 4.20 ERA

References

External links 

 Stacy Piagno on Team USA

People from Nassau County, Florida
American female baseball players
Baseball players from California
1991 births
Living people
Baseball players at the 2015 Pan American Games
Pan American Games gold medalists for the United States
Sonoma Stompers players
Pan American Games medalists in baseball
People from Sonoma, California
Medalists at the 2015 Pan American Games
21st-century American women